"The Kentucky Derby Is Decadent and Depraved" is a seminal sports article written by Hunter S. Thompson on the 1970 Kentucky Derby (an annual horse race held in Louisville, Kentucky), which first appeared in an issue of Scanlan's Monthly in June of that year. The article marked the first appearance of what became known as "gonzo journalism", the style that Thompson came to epitomize through the 1970s.

History
The idea for the story began at a dinner party at the Aspen home of novelist James Salter. Thompson queried Scanlan's editor Warren Hinckle, who approved the project and paired Thompson with illustrator Ralph Steadman for the first time.

The genesis of the article has been described by Thompson as akin to "falling down an elevator shaft and landing in a pool of mermaids." Faced with a deadline and without any coherent story for his editors, Thompson began tearing pages from his notebook, numbering them, and sending them to the magazine. Accompanied by Ralph Steadman's sketches (the first of many collaborations between Thompson and Steadman), the resulting story, and the manic, first-person subjectivity that characterized it, were the beginnings of the gonzo style of journalism.

The article is less about the actual race itself – indeed, Thompson and Steadman could not see the race from their standpoint – but rather focuses on the celebration and depravity that surrounds the event. Thompson's depiction includes the events in Louisville, his hometown, in the days before and after the Derby, and Steadman captured the debauched atmosphere in his surreal drawings. Thompson provided up-close views of activities in the Derby infield and grandstand at Churchill Downs, and a running commentary on the drunkenness and lewdness of the crowd, which he states in the article as the only thing he was focusing on with the work. The narrative ends with a bittersweet anagnorisis, somewhat common in Thompson's work; after several days of immersing themselves in raucous partying and alcoholism to get a sense of the event, Thompson and Steadman realize that they have become exactly the type of people they originally planned to caricature.

Thompson died by suicide in 2005.  Shortly thereafter, Steadman recalled their meeting at the Kentucky Derby to the British newspaper The Independent. In the article Steadman remembered his first impression of Thompson that day:
I had turned around and two fierce eyes, firmly socketed inside a bullet-shaped head, were staring at a strange growth I was nurturing on the end of my chin. "Holy shit!" he [Thompson] exclaimed. "They said I was looking for a matted-haired geek with string warts and I guess I've found him." ...This man had an impressive head chiseled from one piece of bone, and the top part was covered down to his eyes by a floppy-brimmed sun hat. His top half was draped in a loose-fitting hunting jacket of multi-colored patchwork. He wore seersucker blue pants, and the whole torso was pivoted on a pair of huge white plimsolls [a type of shoe] with a fine red trim around the bulkheads. Damn near 6-foot-6 of solid bone and meat holding a beaten-up leather bag across his knee and a loaded cigarette holder between the arthritic fingers of his other hand.

Release
The article was first released in the June 1970 edition of Scanlan's Monthly. It was later reprinted in Tom Wolfe's anthology The New Journalism (1973) and also in one of Thompson's own books, The Great Shark Hunt of 1979, a book collecting several of his earlier works.

Reception
The article was not widely read at the time, but Thompson did garner attention from other journalists for its unusual style. In 1970, Bill Cardoso, editor of The Boston Globe Sunday Magazine, wrote to Thompson, whom he had met on a bus full of journalists covering the 1968 New Hampshire primary. Cardoso praised the piece as a breakthrough: "This is it, this is pure Gonzo. If this is a start, keep rolling." Considered the first use of the word Gonzo to describe Thompson's work, Thompson took to the word right away, and according to Steadman said, "Okay, that's what I do. Gonzo."

References

External links
 
 
 

Magazine articles by Hunter S. Thompson
Kentucky Derby
Sports mass media in the United States
1970 documents